The Freeman's Journal, which was published continuously in Dublin from 1763 to 1924, was in the nineteenth century Ireland's leading nationalist newspaper.

Patriot journal
It was founded in 1763 by Charles Lucas and was identified with radical 18th-century Protestant patriot politicians Henry Grattan and Henry Flood. This changed from 1784 when it passed to Francis Higgins (better known as the "Sham Squire") and took a more pro-British and pro-administration view. In fact Francis Higgins is mentioned in the Secret Service Money Book as having betrayed Lord Edward FitzGerald. Higgins was paid £1,000 for information on FitzGerald's capture.

Voice of constitutional nationalism
In the 19th century it became more nationalist in tone, particularly under the control and inspiration of Sir John Gray (1815–75).

The Journal, as it was widely known as, was the leading newspaper in Ireland throughout the 19th century. Contemporary sources record it being read to the largely illiterate population by priests and local teachers gathering in homes. It was mentioned in contemporary literature and was seen as symbolising Irish newspapers for most of its time. By the 1880s it had become the primary media supporter of Charles Stewart Parnell and the Irish Parliamentary Party (IPP). The weekend edition of the paper was known as The Weekly Freeman, which began featuring large format political cartoons in the 1870s.

It was challenged on all sides by rivals. On the nationalist side some preferred The Nation founded by Thomas Davis while others, including radical supporters of Parnell, read the United Irishman. The Anglo-Irish establishment in contrast read the historically Irish unionist The Irish Times. With the split in the IPP over Parnell's relationship with Katherine O'Shea, its readership split too. While  The Journal in September 1891 eventually went with the majority in opposing Parnell, a minority moved to read the Daily Irish Independent. It was also challenged from the turn of the century by William O'Brien's Irish People and the Cork Free Press. With Thomas Sexton becoming Chairman of the Board of Directors (1893–1911),  the Journal languished under his spartanic management.

Superseded by the Irish Independent
The collapse of the IPP in 1918, and the electoral success of Sinn Féin, saw a more radical nationalism appear that increasingly was out of step with the moderation of the Journal. The Irish Independent, the successor to the Daily Irish Independent, was more aggressively marketed. Just prior to the outbreak of the Irish Civil War in March 1922, the Freeman's Journal printing machinery was destroyed by Anti-Treaty IRA men under Rory O'Connor for its support of the Anglo-Irish Treaty. It did not resume publication until after the outbreak of civil war, when the Irish Free State re-asserted its authority over the country.

The Freeman's Journal ceased publication in 1924, when it was merged with the Irish Independent. Until the 1990s, the Irish Independent included the words 'Incorporating the Freeman's Journal' in its mast-head over its editorials.

In fiction
James Joyce drew on his recollection of his visits to the Freeman’s office in 1909 in his novel Ulysses. As the place of Leopold Bloom's employment, the depiction of the paper's offices in the Aeolus chapter has been deemed "an authentic portrait" at a time when the newspaper was "moribund – the Irish Independent having supplanted it as the most popular daily newspaper in Dublin." Its decline is reflected in "the anxious question posed in Aeolus about the Freeman’s editor, WH Brayden: 'But can he save the circulation?'"

Leading proprietors, editors and contributors

 Matthias McDonnell Bodkin
 Henry Brooke
 Edward 'Doc' Byrne
 Wilson Gray
 Sir John Gray
 Charles Lucas
 James Winder Good
 William O'Brien
 Thomas Sexton

See also
 Pádraig Ó Domhnaill

References

1763 establishments in Ireland
1924 disestablishments in Ireland
Daily newspapers published in Ireland
Defunct newspapers published in Ireland
Newspapers published in Ireland
Publications established in 1763
Publications disestablished in 1924